Abdulkarimovo (Äbdelkärim) is a rural locality (a selo) and the administrative centre of Abdulkarimovsky Selsoviet, Baymaksky District, Bashkortostan, Russia. The population was 425 as of 2010. There are 8 streets.

Geography 
Abdulkarimovo is located 45 km southwest of Baymak (the district's administrative centre) by road. Kuvatovo is the nearest rural locality.

Ethnicity 
The village is inhabited by Bashkirs.

References 

Rural localities in Baymaksky District